Tan Boon Wah (born 21 October 1975) is a Singaporean songwriter. He is also a practicing real estate lawyer.

Early life and education 
Tan Boon Wah studied at The Chinese High School between 1988 and 1991 for his secondary school education, and subsequently at Hwa Chong Junior College between 1992 and 1993 for his pre-university education. He studied law in National University of Singapore, and was called to the bar in 2001.

Career

Legal career 
Since graduating from NUS, Tan Boon Wah has been working at Allen & Gledhill, a Singapore law firm, and is a real estate lawyer and a partner at the firm.

Songwriting 
Tan started writing songs during his undergraduate days, with his first song Don't Wish To Let You Know (不想讓你知道) sang by Where Chou in 1999. The song was also Chou's debut song. Its EP was 50,000 copies when it was released. The song was shortlisted by China Music Awards as one of the top performing songs in 1999. Over the years, he cooperated with singers like Stefanie Sun, Stella Chang, A-Mei, Elva Hsiao, Andy Lau, and Tiger Huang. The songs he’s written included Tanya Chua’s Starting Point (原點), Stefanie Sun’s Love Dictionary (愛情字典), Jolin Tsai’s The Choice I Want (我要的選擇), and A-Mei’s A Brighter Future (海闊天空).

Tan took a break from songwriting to concentrate on his legal career in 2005, before resuming songwriting after his career was established. He subsequently started writing songs in his free time, with the earnings from his legal career providing him a stable income.

In 2020, Tan co-wrote the theme song  (刻在我心底的名字) for the movie of the same name (in English, its Chinese title 刻在你心底的名字). The movie box office exceeded more than 100 million NT dollars in Taiwan, and the theme song won the first place in various major charts. The song’s music video hit more than 7.5 million views on YouTube in two months. The song also won the “Best Original Song” in the 57th Golden Horse Awards and the “Song of the Year” in the 32nd Golden Melody Awards. It has been covered by singers such as Fish Leung, Waa Wei, and Weibird. The song, however, has been accused of plagiarism. The three co-writers and Warner Chappell Music together issued a statement through their lawyers denying the allegations.

Singer 
In 2021, Tan released his first single Everlasting (長長久久), which he completed during his quarantine at the hotel for the trip to Taipei to attend the Golden Horse Awards Ceremony in 2020.

Works

Awards

References 

1975 births
Living people
Singaporean songwriters